Cat behavior is a cat's behavior and responses to events and other stimuli. Cat behavior includes body language, elimination habits, aggression, play, communication, hunting, grooming, urine marking, and face rubbing. It varies among individuals, colonies, and breeds.

Communication and sociability can vary greatly among individual cats. In a family with many cats, the interactions can change depending on which individuals are present and how restricted the territory and resources are. One or more individuals may become aggressive: fighting may occur with the attack resulting in scratches and deep bite wounds.

Communication

Kittens vocalize early in development. Some examples of different vocalizations are described below.

 Purring - means that the cat is either content or is self-soothing due to fear 
 Meow - a frequently used greeting. A mother meows when interacting with her young.  
 Hissing or spitting - indicates an angry or defensive cat.  
 Yowl - means that the cat is in distress or feeling aggressive.  
 Chattering - occurs when hunting or tracking potential prey. Consists of quick chirps made while the mouth vibrates. The gaze is fixed and staring. This behavior may be in response to a surge of adrenaline or may be caused by the anticipation of a pending hunt.

Body language

Cats rely strongly on body language to communicate. A cat may rub against an object or lick a person.  Much of a cat's body language is through its tail, ears, head position, and back posture.

The tail 
Observing how a cat holds its tail can give a good sense of the cat’s current temperament.

Held high, may have a slight curl forward - a sign of friendliness. The cat is happy, content, and comfortable. The tail may quiver or vibrate if the cat is excited.

Held low and tucked under - a sign of fear or unease. The cat is attempting to make itself a smaller target to potential threats. 
                                                                                                                                                                                                                          
Flicking, twitching - a sign of agitation. The cat is on high alert or is upset, and is not receptive to interaction. Cats may also flick their tails in an oscillating, snake-like motion, or abruptly from side to side, often just before pouncing on an object or animal.

The eyes 

When cats greet another cat in their vicinity, they can do a slow, languid, long blink to communicate affection if they trust the person or animal they are in contact with. It is a sign of trust. One way to communicate love and trust to a cat is to say their name, get their attention, look them in the eyes and then slowly blink at them to emulate trust and love, and they may return the gesture.

Scent rubbing and spraying
These behaviors are thought to be a way of marking territory. Facial marking behavior is used to mark their territory as "safe". The cat rubs its cheeks on prominent objects in the preferred territory, depositing a chemical pheromone produced in glands in the cheeks. This is known as a contentment pheromone. Synthetic versions of the feline facial pheromone are available commercially.

Cats have anal sacs or scent glands. Scent is deposited on the feces as it is eliminated. Unlike intact male cats, female and neutered male cats usually do not spray urine. Spraying is accomplished by backing up against a vertical surface and spraying a jet of urine on that surface. Unlike a dog's penis, a cat's penis points backward. Males neutered in adulthood may still spray after neutering. Urinating on horizontal surfaces in the home, outside the litter box may indicate dissatisfaction with the box, due to a variety of factors such as substrate texture, cleanliness and privacy. It can also be a sign of urinary tract problems. Male cats on poor diets are susceptible to crystal formation in the urine which can block the urethra and create a medical emergency.

Body postures
A cat's posture communicates its emotions.  It is best to observe cats' natural behavior when they are by themselves, with humans, and with other animals. Their postures can be friendly or aggressive, depending upon the situation.  Some of the most basic and familiar cat postures include the following:

Relaxed posture – The cat is seen lying on the side or sitting. Its breathing is slow to normal, with legs bent, or hind legs laid out or extended.  The tail is loosely wrapped, extended, or held up. It also hangs down loosely when the cat is standing.
Stretching posture – another posture indicating the cat is relaxed.
Yawning posture – either by itself, or in conjunction with a stretch: another posture of a relaxed cat.
Alert posture – The cat is lying on its belly, or it may be sitting. Its back is almost horizontal when standing and moving. Its breathing is normal, with its legs bent or extended (when standing). Its tail is curved back or straight upwards, and there may be twitching while the tail is positioned downwards.
Tense posture – The cat is lying on its belly, with the back of its body lower than its upper body (slinking) when standing or moving back. Its legs, including the hind legs are bent, and its front legs are extended when standing. Its tail is close to the body, tensed or curled downwards; there can be twitching when the cat is standing up.
Anxious/ovulating posture – The cat is lying on its belly. The back of the body is more visibly lower than the front part when the cat is standing or moving. Its breathing may be fast, and its legs are tucked under its body. The tail is close to the body and may be curled forward (or close to the body when standing), with the tip of the tail moving up and down (or side to side).
Fearful posture – The cat is lying on its belly or crouching directly on top of its paws. Its entire body may be shaking and very near the ground when standing up. Breathing is also fast, with its legs bent near the surface, and its tail curled and very close to its body when standing on all fours.
Confident posture – The cat may walk around in a more comfortable manner with its tail up to the sky indicating their importance. Cats often walk through houses with their tail standing up high above them making them look grander and more elegant.
Terrified posture – The cat is crouched directly on top of its paws, with visible shaking seen in some parts of the body. Its tail is close to the body, and it can be standing up, together with its hair at the back. The legs are very stiff or even bent to increase their size. Typically, cats avoid contact when they feel threatened, although they can resort to varying degrees of aggression when they feel cornered, or when escape is impossible.

Grooming 

Oral grooming for domestic and feral cats is a common behavior; recent studies on domestic cats show that they spend about 8% of resting time grooming themselves. Grooming is extremely important not only to clean themselves but also to ensure ectoparasite control. Fleas tend to be the most common ectoparasite of cats and some studies allude to indirect evidence that grooming in cats is effective in removing fleas. Cats not only use their tongue for grooming to control ectoparasites but scratch grooming as well may aid in dislodging fleas from the head and neck.

Kneading

Kittens "knead" the breast while suckling, using the forelimbs one at a time in an alternating pattern to push against the mammary glands to stimulate lactation in the mother.

Cats carry these infantile behaviors beyond nursing and into adulthood. Some cats "nurse", i.e. suck, on clothing or bedding during kneading. The cat exerts firm downwards pressure with its paw, opening its toes to expose its claws, then closes its claws as it lifts its paw. The process takes place with alternate paws at intervals of one to two seconds. They may knead while sitting on their owner's lap, which may prove painful if the cat has sharp claws.

Since most of the preferred "domestic traits" are neotenous or juvenile traits that persist in the adult, kneading may be a relic juvenile behavior retained in adult domestic cats. It may also stimulate the cat and make it feel good, in the same manner as a human stretching. Kneading is often a precursor to sleeping. Many cats purr while kneading. They also purr mostly when newborn, when feeding, or when trying to feed on their mother's teat. The common association between the two behaviors may corroborate the evidence in favor of the origin of kneading as a remnant instinct.

Panting

Unlike dogs, panting is a rare occurrence in cats, except in warm weather environments. Some cats may pant in response to anxiety, fear or excitement. It can also be caused by play, exercise, or stress from things like car rides. However, if panting is excessive or the cat appears in distress, it may be a symptom of a more serious condition, such as a nasal blockage, heartworm disease, head trauma, or drug poisoning. In many cases, feline panting, especially if accompanied by other symptoms, such as coughing or shallow breathing (dyspnea), is considered to be abnormal, and treated as a medical emergency.

Reflexes

Righting reflex

The righting reflex is the attempt of cats to land on their feet at the completion of a jump or a fall. They can do this more easily than other animals due to their flexible spine, floating collar bone, and loose skin. Cats also use vision and their vestibular apparatus to help tell which way to turn. They can then stretch themselves out and relax their muscles. The righting reflex does not always result in the cat landing on its feet
at the completion of the fall.

Freeze reflex
Adult cats are able to make use of pinch-induced behavioural inhibition to induce a 'freeze reflex' in their young which enables them to be transported by the neck without resisting. This reflex can also be exhibited by adults. This is also known as 'clipnosis'.

Eating patterns

Cats are obligate carnivores, and do not do well on vegetarian diets. In the wild they usually hunt smaller mammals to keep themselves nourished.  Many cats find and chew small quantities of long grass but this is not for its nutritional value per se. The eating of grass seems to stem from feline ancestry and has nothing to do with dietary requirements. It is believed that feline ancestors instead ate grass for the purging of intestinal parasites.

Cats have no sweet taste receptors on their tongue and thus cannot taste sweet things at all. Cats mainly smell for their food and what they taste for is amino acids instead. This may be a cause of cats being diagnosed with diabetes. The food that domestic cats get has a lot of carbohydrates in it and a high sugar content cannot be efficiently processed by the digestive system of cats.

Cats drink water by lapping the surface with their tongue. A fraction of a teaspoon of water is taken up with each lap. Although some desert cats are able to obtain much of their water needs through the flesh of their prey, most cats come to bodies of water to drink.

Eating patterns is another indicator to understand the behavior changers in domestic cats. The changers in typical eating patterns can be an early signal for possible physical or psychological health problem. 

A cat's eating pattern in a domestic setting is essential for the cat and owner bond to form. This happens because cats form attachments to households that regularly feed them. Some cats ask for food dozens of times a day, including at night, with rubbing, pacing, and meowing, or sometimes loud purring.

Excretion  
Cats tend to bury their feces after defecating and can be attracted to a litter box if it has attractant in it. Cats will generally defecate more in those litter boxes too.

Socialization
Socialization is defined as a member of a specific group learning to be part of that group. It is said to be a continuous learning process that allows an individual to learn the necessary skills and behaviours required for a particular social position.

Cats, domestic or wild, do participate in social behaviours, even though it is thought that most cat species (besides lions) are solitary, anti-social animals. Under certain circumstances, such as food availability, shelter, or protection, cats can be seen in groups.

The social behaviours that cats participate in are colony organization, social learning, socialization between cats, and socialization with humans.

Colony organization 

Free-living domestic cats tend to form small to large colonies. Small colonies consist of one female, known as a queen, and her kittens. Large colonies consist of several queens and their kittens. Male cats are present in both types of colonies and serve the purpose of reproduction and defending territory. Within these colonies altruistic behaviour occurs. This means that if an expecting queen helps another queen that just gave birth, then the helping queen will get help when she gives birth in return.

Although free living cats are found in colonies, stable social order, like that of the lion, does not exist. Free living cats usually are found in colonies for protection against predators, and food availability. Although there are many advantages of group living, such as easy access to mates, and defensive measures to protect food, there are also disadvantages, such as sexual competition for mates, and if the group becomes too big then fights may break out over food.

Social learning 
Cats are observational learners. This type of learning emerges early in a cat's life, and has been shown in many laboratory studies. Young kittens learn to hunt from their mothers by observing their techniques when catching prey. The mother ensures their kittens learn hunting techniques by first bringing dead prey to the litter, then live prey. With the live prey, she demonstrates the techniques required for successful capture to her kittens by bringing the live prey to the litter for the kittens to catch themselves. Prey-catching behaviour of kittens improves over time when mothers are present over when they are not.

Observational learning for cats can be described in terms of the drive to complete the behaviour, the cue that initiates the behaviour, the response to the cue, and the reward for completing the behaviour. This is shown above when cats learn predatory behaviour from their mothers. The drive is hunger, the cue is the prey, the response is to catch the prey, and the reward is to relieve the hunger sensation.

Kittens also show observational learning when they are socializing with humans. They are more likely to initiate socialization with humans when their mothers are exhibiting non-aggressive and non-defensive behaviours. Even though mothers spend most time with their kittens, male cats play an important role by breaking up fights among litter mates.

Observational learning is not limited to kitten-hood, it can also be observed during adulthood. Studies have been done with adult cats performing a task, such as pressing a lever after a visual cue. Adult cats that see others performing a task learn to perform the same task faster than those who did not witness another cat.

Socialization between cats 
When strange cats meet, ideally they would cautiously allow the strange cat to smell its hindquarters, but this does not happen very often. Usually when strange cats meet, one cat makes a sudden movement that puts the other cat into a defensive mode. The cat will then draw in on itself and prepare to attack if needed. If an attack were to happen the subordinate cat will usually run away, but this does not happen all the time and it could lead to a tomcat duel. Dominance is also seen as an underlying factor for how conspecifics interact with each other.

Dominance can be seen among cats in multi-cat households. It can be seen when other cats submit to the "dominant" cat. Dominance includes such behaviours as walking around the dominant cat, waiting for the dominant cat to walk past, avoiding eye contact, crouching, laying on their side (defensive posture), and retreating when the dominant cat approaches. Dominant cats present a specific body posture as well. The cat displays ears straight up, the base of its tail will be arched, and it looks directly at subordinate cats. These dominant cats are usually not aggressive, but if a subordinate cat blocks food they may become aggressive. When this aggressive behaviour occurs it could also lead to the dominant cat preventing subordinate cats from eating and using the litter box. This can cause the subordinate cat to defecate somewhere else and create problems with human interaction.

Social conflicts 

Social conflicts among cats depend solely on the behaviour of the cats. Some research has shown that cats rarely pick fights, but when they do, it's usually for protecting food and/or litters, and defending territory.

The first sign of an imminent tomcat duel is when both cats draw themselves up high on their legs, all hair along the middle of their backs is standing straight up, and they mew and howl loudly as they approach one another. The steps the cats make become slower and shorter the closer they become to one another. Once they are close enough to attack, they pause slightly, and then one cat leaps and tries to bite the nape of the other cat. The other cat has no choice but to retaliate and both cats roll aggressively on the ground, and loud intense screams come from both cats. After some time the cats separate and stand face to face to begin the attack all over again. This can go on for some time until one cat does not get up again and remains seated. The defeated cat does not move until the victor has completed a sniff of the area and moves outside the fighting area. Once this happens the defeated cat leaves the area, ending the duel.

Females may also fight with each other. If a male and female do not get along, they may also fight. Cats may need to be reintroduced or separated to avoid fights in a closed household.

Socialization with humans 

Cats have learned how to develop their vocals in order to converse with humans, in which they try to tell humans what they want. One way that cats and humans interact is through  "head bunting," in which a cat rubs its head on a human in order to leave their scent, mark to claim territory, and create a bond. Cats can sometimes take cues from human pointing and from the direction of human gazes. They can sometimes discriminate between, and sometimes even correlate, human facial expressions, attentional states, and voices. As well as its own name, a cat can sometimes learn the names of humans and other cats.

Cats between the age of three to nine weeks are sensitive to human socialization; after this period socialization can be less effective. Studies have shown that the earlier the kitten is handled, the less fearful the kitten will be towards humans. Other factors that can enhance socialization are having many people handle the kitten frequently, the presence of the mother, and feeding. The presence of the mother is important because cats are observational learners. If the mother is comfortable around humans then it can reduce anxiety in the kitten and promote the kitten-human relationship.

Feral kittens around two to seven weeks old can be socialized usually within a month of capture. Some species of cats cannot be socialized towards humans because of factors like genetic influence and in some cases specific learning experiences. The best way to get a kitten to socialize is to handle the kitten for many hours a week. The process is made easier if there is another socialized cat present but not necessarily in the same space as the feral. If the handler can get a cat to urinate in the litter tray, then the others in a litter will usually follow. Initial contact with thick gloves is highly recommended until trust is established, usually within the first week. It is a challenge to socialize an adult. Socialized adult feral cats tend to trust only those who they trusted in their socialization period, and therefore can be very fearful around strangers.

Cats are also used for companion animals. Studies have shown that these animals provide many physiological and psychological benefits for the owner. Other aspects of cat behaviour that are deemed advantageous for the human–cat bond are cat hygiene (cats are known for good hygiene), they do not have to be taken outside (use of the litter box), they are perfect for smaller spaces, and they have no problems with being left alone for extended periods of time. Even though there are a number of benefits for owning a cat, there are a number of problematic behaviours that affect the human–cat relationship. One behaviour is when cats attack people by clawing and biting. This often occurs spontaneously or could be triggered by sudden movements. Another problematic behaviour is the "petting and biting syndrome", which involves the cat being petted and then suddenly attacking and running away. Other problems are house soiling, scratching furniture, and when a cat brings dead prey into the house. 

There are 52 measured cat personality traits in cats, with one study suggesting "five reliable personality factors were found using principal axis factor analysis: neuroticism, extraversion, dominance, impulsiveness and agreeableness."

Predatory behavior

Cats are natural predators. When allowed to roam outdoors, many cats will engage in predation on wildlife. Understanding an indoor cat's personality can go a long way to satisfy their instincts and avoid potentially inconvenient behavior (such as sudden hissing, dashing around the house, or climbing the curtains). Environmental enrichment items include:
 A good-sized cat tree, with scratching posts
 Toys that provide a release for their predatory instincts
 A well kept litter box or toilet
 Fresh water and dry cat food
 Social interaction

Environment

Cats like to organize their environment based on their needs. Like their ancestors, domestic cats still have an inherent desire to maintain an independent territory but are generally content to live with other cats for company as they easily get bored. Living alone for a longer time may cause them to forget how to communicate with other cats.

Sometimes, however, adding a kitten to a household can be a bad idea. If there already is an older cat present and another cat is added to their environment it may be better to get another older cat that has been socialized with other cats. When a kitten is introduced to a mature cat, that cat may show feline asocial aggression where they feel threatened and act aggressive to drive off the intruders. If this happens, the kitten and the cat should be separated, and slowly introduced by rubbing towels on the animals and presenting the towel to the other.

Cats use scent and pheromones to help organize their territory by marking prominent objects. If these objects or scents are removed it upsets the cat's perception of its environment.

See also

Cat behaviorist
Cat communication
 Cat play and toys
 Ethology
 Cat training

References

 

 
Animal communication
Ethology
Articles containing video clips